The 1998 Kilkenny Senior Hurling Championship was the 104th staging of the Kilkenny Senior Hurling Championship since its establishment by the Kilkenny County Board. The championship began on 26 September 1998 and ended on 1 November 1998.

Dunnamaggin were the defending champions, however, they were defeated by O'Loughlin Gaels in the first round. They were eventually relegated after losing to St. Martin's in a play-off.

On 1 November 1998, Graigue-Ballycallan won the title after a 1–14 to 0–12 defeat of Fenians in the final at Nowlan Park. It was their first ever championship title.

Brendan Ryan from the Fenians club was the championship's top scorer with 1–19.

Team changes

To Championship

Promoted from the Kilkenny Intermediate Hurling Championship
 Ballyhale Shamrocks

From Championship

Relegated to the Kilkenny Intermediate Hurling Championship
 Mooncoin

Results

First round

Relegation play-off

Quarter-finals

Semi-finals

Final

Championship statistics

Top scorers

Overall

Single game

References

Kilkenny Senior Hurling Championship
Kilkenny Senior Hurling Championship